Xylocoris is a genus of bugs in the monotypic tribe Xylocorini of the family Anthocoridae. There are approximately 50 described species in Xylocoris worldwide. Nearly 30 species occur in the Palaearctic Region, 10 are known from the Nearctic Region, and 6 from the Oriental Region. They occur in various habitats, often found under plant litter and under tree bark where they feed on small arthropods. Certain species (X. afer, X. cerealis, X. cursitans, X. flavipes, X. galactinus, X. hyalinipennis, X. queenslandicus, X. sordidus, X. vicarius) inhabit stored food facilities.

Species
 Xylocoris afer (Reuter, 1884)
 Xylocoris betulinus Drake and Harris, 1926
 Xylocoris californicus (Reuter, 1884)
 Xylocoris cerealis Yamada & Yasunaga, 2006
 Xylocoris cursitans (Fallén, 1807)
 Xylocoris flavipes (Reuter, 1875) (warehouse pirate bug)
 Xylocoris formicetorum (Boheman, 1844)
 Xylocoris galactinus (Fieber, 1837)
 Xylocoris hirtus Kelton, 1976
 Xylocoris hiurai Kerzhner & Elov, 1976
 Xylocoris lativentris (J. Sahlberg, 1870)
 Xylocoris obliquus A. Costa, 1853
 Xylocoris parvulus (Reuter, 1871)
 Xylocoris pilipes Kelton, 1976
 Xylocoris punctatus Kelton, 1976
 Xylocoris queenslandicus Gross, 1954
 Xylocoris sordidus (Reuter, 1871)
 Xylocoris vicarius (Reuter, 1884)

References

Further reading

 
 
 

Lyctocoridae genera
Lyctocoridae